Wells is the central village and a census-designated place (CDP) in the town of Wells, Rutland County, Vermont, United States. As of the 2020 census, it had a population of 386, out of 1,214 in the entire town.

The CDP is in southwestern Rutland County, in the southwest part of the town of Wells. It sits at the western base of the Taconic Mountains, where Wells Brook exits and flows west toward the Mettawee River, a northwest-flowing tributary of Lake Champlain.

Vermont Route 30 passes through the village, leading north  to Poultney and south  to Pawlet.

References 

Populated places in Rutland County, Vermont
Census-designated places in Rutland County, Vermont
Census-designated places in Vermont